Kalininsky (masculine), Kalininskaya (feminine), or Kalininskoye (neuter) may refer to:
Kalininsky District, name of several districts in the countries of the former Soviet Union
Kalininsky (rural locality) (Kalininskaya, Kalininskoye), name of several rural localities in Russia
Kalininskaya Line, a line of the Moscow Metro, Moscow, Russia

See also
 Kalinin (disambiguation)
 Kalininsk (disambiguation)